The Philippine expedition was a two and a half year scientific expedition of the  to the Philippine Islands.  It was the longest voyage of that vessel and, after the United States Exploring Expedition, was the second longest maritime research expedition undertaken by the United States. It spanned from 1907 to 1910, and was directed by Hugh McCormick Smith, an ichthyologist and then Deputy Commissioner of the U. S. Bureau of Fisheries.  The expedition collected approximately 100,000 fish specimens, although the exact number is not known.

References 

Pacific expeditions
History of science and technology in the United States